Prabhatsinh Chauhan (born February 11, 1932) is an Indian politician. He was elected to the Lok Sabha, lower house of the Parliament of India from Kheda , Gujarat as a member of the Janata Dal.

References

External links
 Official biographical sketch in Parliament of India website

India MPs 1989–1991
Lok Sabha members from Gujarat
Janata Dal politicians
1932 births
Living people